Cornelis "Cor" Pot (born 8 June 1951) is a Dutch football manager and former professional footballer.

Playing career 
Pot started his career with the academy of Sparta in Rotterdam, and subsequently moved to the Ajax academy.

Coaching career 
Pot was sacked as manager of the Netherlands U21 national team team after its elimination from the 2013 UEFA European Under-21 Football Championship in the semifinals and subsequent criticism by the coach of the senior team, Louis van Gaal.

Personal life 
Besides his native Dutch, Cor Pot speaks English, German.

He has two sons, both are football players.

References 

1951 births
Living people
Footballers from The Hague
Dutch footballers
Dutch football managers
Eredivisie players
Eerste Divisie players
Excelsior Rotterdam managers
Dynamo Dresden managers
Sparta Rotterdam players
Excelsior Rotterdam players
HFC Haarlem players
MVV Maastricht players
NAC Breda managers
RBC Roosendaal managers
SC Telstar managers
Al Masry SC managers
Expatriate football managers in Germany
Expatriate football managers in Egypt
Association football midfielders
Dutch expatriate football managers
Dutch expatriate sportspeople in Egypt
Dutch expatriate sportspeople in Germany